Remember Who I Am is Girlyman's first album, independently released in fall of 2003, nationally rereleased September 7, 2004 on Daemon Records.

"Viola" previously appeared on Nate Borofsky's solo album, Never Enough Time.

Track listing
 Viola (Nate Borofsky) - 3:50
 Hey Rose (Ty Greenstein) - 3:04
 Say Goodbye (Doris Muramatsu) - 4:17
 Fall Stories (Nate Borofsky & Eden Coughlin) - 2:42
 The Shape I Found You In (Ty Greenstein) - 3:30
 Maori (Nate Borofsky) 3:25
 Montpelier (Nate Borofsky) 3:55
 Even If (Doris Muramatsu) 3:25
 David (Ty Greenstein) 4:34
 My Sweet Lord (George Harrison) 3:44
 Postcards From Mexico (Nate Borofsky & Eden Coughlin) 2:40
 Amaze Me (Ty Greenstein) 4:10

Awards
 Winner, Independent Music Award, 2004 - Song, Folk/Singer-Songwriter Category: "Viola"
 Winner, Outmusic Award, 2004 - Best New Album

2003 albums
Daemon Records albums